The 1957 San Diego State Aztecs football team represented San Diego State College during the 1957 NCAA College Division football season.

San Diego State competed in the California Collegiate Athletic Association (CCAA). The team was led by head coach Paul Governali, in his second year, and played home games at Aztec Bowl. They finished the season with two wins and seven losses (2–7, 0–1 CCAA). The Aztecs were shutout in four consecutive games and scored only 77 points in their nine games while giving up 243.

Schedule

Team players in the NFL
No San Diego State players were selected in the 1958 NFL Draft.

Notes

References

San Diego State
San Diego State Aztecs football seasons
San Diego State Aztecs football